Frigid may refer to
 Cold
 Polar region or frigid zone, one of the two geographical zones of the Earth's surface within the polar circles
 FRIGID New York, an Off-Off-Broadway festival hosted by Horsetrade Theatre
 Hypoactive sexual desire disorder, also called frigidity

See also
 Frijid Pink, an American rock band